Swami Dada is a 1982 Indian Hindi-language action film directed by Dev Anand, starring Mithun Chakraborty, Naseeruddin Shah, newcomer Christine O'Neil, Padmini Kohlapure and Dev Anand. The film was the first credited screen appearance of Jackie Shroff. Music was provided by R.D.Burman for this film. A couple of songs became popular.

Plot

Swami Dada is the story of Hari Mohan, a saintly person who organizes Hindu prayers and discourses in a warm and welcoming atmosphere. He is called "Swami Dada" by everyone. He has many followers and devotees who throng in large numbers to hear his sermons. What they do not know that Hari Mohan is a professional thief, and is now conspiring with a young woman, and a group of orphaned children to steal the temple's jewellery.

Cast
 Dev Anand as Hari Mohan / Swami Dada
 Mithun Chakraborty as Suresh
 Rati Agnihotri as Seema
 Padmini Kohlapure as Chamkili
 Naseeruddin Shah as Aslam 
 Jackie Shroff as uncredited (as a fighter in an action scene)
 Kulbhushan Kharbanda as Ramu Dada / Bhagwan Seth
 Shakti Kapoor as Jaggu
 Mohan Sherry
 Bharat Kapoor Lallu

Soundtrack

The music composed by R. D. Burman and the lyrics were written by Anjaan. Udit Narayan is an uncredited singer for a short Bhajan picturised on Dev Anand.

References

External links

1982 films
1980s Hindi-language films
Films directed by Dev Anand
Films scored by R. D. Burman